George Miller  (born 3 March 1945) is an Australian filmmaker best known for his Mad Max franchise, whose second installment, Mad Max 2, and fourth, Fury Road, have been hailed as two of the greatest action films of all time, with Fury Road winning six Academy Awards. Miller is very diverse in genre and style as he also directed the biographical medical drama Lorenzo's Oil, the dark fantasy The Witches of Eastwick, the Academy Award-winning animated film Happy Feet, produced the family-friendly fantasy adventure Babe and directed the sequel Babe: Pig in the City.

Miller is a co-founder of the production houses Kennedy Miller Mitchell, formerly known as Kennedy Miller, and Dr. D Studios. His younger brother Bill Miller and Doug Mitchell have been producers on almost all the films in Miller's later career, since the death of his original producing partner Byron Kennedy.

In 2006, Miller won the Academy Award for Best Animated Feature for Happy Feet (2006). He has been nominated for five other Academy Awards: Best Original Screenplay in 1992 for Lorenzo's Oil, Best Picture and Best Adapted Screenplay in 1995 for Babe, and Best Picture and Best Director for Fury Road in 2015.

Early life
Miller was born on 3 March 1945 in Chinchilla, Queensland, to Greek immigrant parents: Jim Miller and mother Angela. Jim (aka Dimitrios) was born on the Greek island of Kythira, Jim's father anglicised his surname from Miliotis to Miller when he emigrated to Australia; Angela's family were Greek refugees from Anatolia, displaced by the 1923 population exchange. The couple married and settled in Chinchilla and had four sons: fraternal twins George and John, Chris, and Bill.

George attended Ipswich Grammar School and later Sydney Boys High School, then studied medicine at the University of New South Wales with his twin brother John. While in his final year at medical school (1971), George and his younger brother Chris made St. Vincent's Revue Film, a one-minute short film that won them first prize in a student competition. In 1971, George attended a film workshop at Melbourne University where he met fellow student, Byron Kennedy, with whom he formed a lasting friendship and production partnership, until Kennedy's death. In 1972, Miller completed his residency at Sydney's St Vincent's Hospital, spending his time off crewing on short experimental films. That same year, Miller and Kennedy founded Kennedy Miller Productions. The pair subsequently collaborated on numerous works. After Kennedy died in 1983, Miller kept his name in the company. It was later renamed Kennedy Miller Mitchell in 2009 as a way to recognise producer Doug Mitchell's role in the company.

Career

Miller's first work, the short film Violence in Cinema: Part 1 (1971), polarised critics, audiences and distributors so much that it was placed in the documentary category at the 1972 Sydney Film Festival due to its matter-of-fact depiction of cinematic violence. In 1979, Miller made his feature-length directorial debut with Mad Max. Based on a script written by Miller and James McCausland in 1975, the film was independently financed by Kennedy Miller Productions and went on to become an international success. As a result, the film spawned the Mad Max series with two further sequels starring Mel Gibson and a third starring Tom Hardy and Charlize Theron: Mad Max 2 also released as The Road Warrior (1981), Mad Max Beyond Thunderdome (1985) and Mad Max: Fury Road (2015).

During the time between the second and third Mad Max films, Miller directed a remake of "Nightmare at 20,000 Feet" as a segment for the anthology film Twilight Zone: The Movie (1983). He also co-produced and co-directed many acclaimed miniseries for Australian television including The Dismissal (1983) and The Cowra Breakout (1984).

In 1987, Miller directed The Witches of Eastwick, starring Jack Nicholson, Susan Sarandon, Cher and Michelle Pfeiffer. The film proved to be a troubling experience for Miller. "I quit the film twice and Jack [Nicholson] held me in there," said Miller. "He said, 'Just sit down, lose your emotion, and have a look at the work. If you think the work is good, stick with the film.' And he was a great man. I learnt more from him than anybody else I think I’d worked for – he was extraordinary." Nicholson also coached Miller to exaggerate his needs during the production, asking for 300 extras when he only needed 150, knowing that his producers would give him less than he requested. The award-winning production designer Polly Platt also collaborated closely with Miller on The Witches of Eastwick. Cher later said that prior to working on the film, Miller called her at home, the day after her 40th birthday, to inform her that he and Nicholson didn't want her in the film. She was deemed "too old and not sexy".

Following The Witches of Eastwick, Miller focused primarily on producing Australian projects. His role as producer of Flirting, Dead Calm and the TV miniseries Bangkok Hilton and Vietnam, all starring Nicole Kidman, was instrumental in the development of her career.

Miller returned to directing with the release of Lorenzo's Oil (1992), which he co-wrote with Nick Enright.

In 1993, Miller was hired to direct Contact based on the story by Carl Sagan and Ann Druyan. After working on the film for over a year, Warner Bros. and Miller mutually agreed to part ways and Robert Zemeckis was eventually brought on to direct.

Miller also co-wrote the comedy-drama Babe (1995) and wrote and directed its sequel Babe: Pig in the City (1998).

Miller was also the creator of Happy Feet, a musical epic about the life of penguins in Antarctica. The Warner Bros.-produced film was released in November 2006. As well as being a runaway box office success, Happy Feet also brought Miller his fourth Academy Award nomination, and his first win in the category of Best Animated Feature.

In 2007, Miller signed on to direct a Justice League film titled Justice League: Mortal. While production was initially held up due to the 2007–08 Writers Guild of America strike, further production delays and the success of The Dark Knight led to Warner Bros. deciding to put the film on hold and pursue different options.

In 2011, the Happy Feet sequel Happy Feet Two was released. The following year, Miller began principal photography on Mad Max: Fury Road, the fourth film in the Mad Max series, after several years of production delays. Fury Road was released on 15 May 2015. The film was met with widespread critical acclaim and received 10 Academy Award nominations including Best Picture, while Miller himself was nominated for the Academy Award for Best Director.

In October 2018 it was announced that Miller would direct Three Thousand Years of Longing, which began filming in November 2020. The film premiered at the Cannes Film Festival in May 2022.

In April 2017, Miller said that he and co-writer Nico Lathouris have finished two additional post-Fury Road scripts for the Mad Max series. The Fury Road lead, Tom Hardy, is committed to the next sequel. In 2015, and again in early 2017, Miller said "the fifth film in the franchise will be titled Mad Max: The Wasteland." In 2020, it was reported that Miller would next direct the Mad Max spinoff Furiosa.

Dr D Studios

Dr D Studios was a Sydney-based digital animation studio founded in mid-2007 as a partnership between Kennedy Miller Mitchell and Omnilab Media. Following the financially unsuccessful release of Happy Feet Two (2011) and the long delay of Mad Max: Fury Road (2015), the studio closed down in 2013.

Personal life
Miller was married to actress Sandy Gore from 1985-1992; they share a daughter. He has been married to film editor Margaret Sixel since 1995; they have two sons. The two initially met during the production of Flirting, and Sixel has since worked on all of Miller's directorial efforts in some capacity.

Miller is the Patron of the Australian Film Institute and the BIFF (Brisbane International Film Festival) and a co-patron of the Sydney Film Festival.

Miller has said on multiple occasions that the 1940 version of Pinocchio is one of his favourite films. 

Miller is a feminist, having told Vanity Fair in May 2015, "I've gone from being very male dominant to being surrounded by magnificent women. I can’t help but be a feminist."

Filmography

Short films

Feature films 

Producer

Other credits

Television 

Producer

Music video

Awards and recognition

 1996: Appointed an Officer of the Order of Australia (AO)
 1999: Received an honorary Doctor of Letters from the University of New South Wales
 2007: Received The Queensland – United States Personal Achievement Award at the Queensland Expatriate Awards at the Rainbow Room in New York
 2007 (April): Awarded an honorary Master of Arts degree by the Australian Film Television and Radio School.
 2008: Awarded an honorary Doctorate from the Griffith University.
 2009: Awarded the French Order of the Arts and Letters.
 2010: First non-US Filmmaker to be awarded "honorary member" status among the VES.
 2016: Served as President of the Jury for the Palme d'Or at the 69th Cannes Film Festival.
2018: Inducted into the Queensland Business Leaders Hall of Fame.

References

External links

 
 
 
 Dr George Miller Digital Story and Oral History, Queensland Business Leaders Hall of Fame 2018, State Library of Queensland.

1945 births
20th-century Australian medical doctors
Action film directors
Australian feminists
Australian film directors
Australian film producers
Australian film studio executives
Australian people of Greek descent
Australian screenwriters
Australian television producers
BAFTA winners (people)
Best Director AACTA International Award winners
Celebrity doctors
Directors of Best Animated Feature Academy Award winners
Feminist filmmakers
Golden Globe Award-winning producers
Living people
Male feminists
Nebula Award winners
Officers of the Order of Australia
People educated at Sydney Boys High School
People from Brisbane
People from Sydney
Australian twins
University of New South Wales alumni